Mickaël Stéphan (born December 17, 1975) is a French retired midfielder.

Stéphan has played in Ligue 2 for ASOA Valence and Angers SCO.

References

1975 births
Living people
Sportspeople from Valence, Drôme
French footballers
ASOA Valence players
Angers SCO players
Entente SSG players
Ligue 2 players
Association football midfielders
Footballers from Auvergne-Rhône-Alpes